Hajji Babay may refer to:
 Hajji Babay-e Olya
 Hajji Babay-e Sofla
 Hajji Babay-e Vosta